Fuck is English-language profanity which often refers to the act of sexual intercourse, but is also commonly used as an intensifier or to convey disdain. While its origin is obscure, it is usually considered to be first attested to around 1475 CE. In modern usage, the term fuck and its derivatives (such as fucker and fucking) are used as a noun, a verb, an adjective, an interjection or an adverb. There are many common phrases that employ the word as well as compounds that incorporate it, such as motherfucker, fuckwit, fuckup, fucknut, fucktard, and fuck off.

Offensiveness 
It is unclear whether the word has always been considered a pejorative or, if not, when it first came to be used to describe (often in an extremely angry, hostile or belligerent manner) unpleasant circumstances or people in an intentionally offensive way, such as in the term motherfucker, one of its more common usages in some parts of the English-speaking world. Some English-speaking countries censor it on television and radio. Andrea Millwood Hargrave's 2000 study of the attitudes of the British public found that fuck was considered the third-most-severe profanity, and its derivative motherfucker second. Cunt was considered the most severe.

Nevertheless, the word has increasingly become less of a pejorative and more publicly acceptable, an example of the "dysphemism treadmill" or semantic drift known as melioration, wherein former pejoratives become inoffensive and commonplace. Because of its increasing usage in the public forum, in 2005 the word was included for the first time as one of three vulgarities in The Canadian Press's Canadian Press Caps and Spelling guide. Journalists were advised to refrain from censoring the word but use it sparingly and only when its inclusion was essential to the story. According to linguist Pamela Hobbs, "notwithstanding its increasing public use, enduring cultural models that inform our beliefs about the nature of sexuality and sexual acts preserve its status as a vile utterance that continues to inspire moral outrage." Hobbs considers users rather than usage of the word and sub-divides users into "non-users", for whom "the word belongs to a set of taboo words, the very utterance of which constitutes an affront, and any use of the word, regardless of its form (verb, adjective, adverb, etc.) or meaning (literal or metaphorical) evokes the core sexual meanings and associated sexual imagery that motivate the taboo."; and "users", for whom "metaphorical uses of the word fuck no more evoke images of sexual intercourse than a ten-year-old's 'My mom'll kill me if she finds out' evokes images of murder," so that the "criteria of taboo are missing."

Etymology

Germanic cognates
The Oxford English Dictionary states that the ultimate etymology is uncertain, but that the word is "probably cognate" with a number of Germanic words with meanings involving striking, rubbing and having sex or is derivative of the Old French word that meant 'to have sex'.

By application of Grimm's law, this hypothetical root also has the Pre-Germanic form *pug-néh2- (''to blow'), which is the etymon of, amongst others, Dutch fok(zeil) ('foresail'). There is a theory that fuck is most likely derived from German or Dutch roots, and is probably not derived from an Old English root.

False etymologies
One reason that the word fuck is so hard to trace etymologically is that it was used far more extensively in common speech than in easily traceable written forms. There are multiple urban legends that advance false etymologies declaring the word to be an acronym. One of these urban legends is that the word fuck came from Irish law. If a couple was caught committing adultery, the two would be punished "For Unlawful Carnal Knowledge In the Nude", with FUCKIN written on the stocks above to denote the crime. A variant misconception alleges church clerks to have recorded the crime of "Forbidden Use of Carnal Knowledge". Another is that of a royal permission granted in the Middle Ages: the Black Death and the scarcity of uncontaminated resources drove towns to control both human interactions and population growth. Supposedly many towns required permission to intermingle or to make babies. Hence, no couple could do either without royal permission (usually from a local magistrate or lord) which required placing a sign visible from the road that said Fornicating Under Consent of King, which was later shortened to FUCK. This story is hard to document, has persisted in oral and literary traditions for many years, but has been proven false.

A false etymology first made popular on the radio show Car Talk says that the phrase fuck you derives from pluck yew in connection with a misconception regarding the origins of the V sign. This misconception states that English archers believed that those who were captured by the French had their index and middle fingers cut off so that they could no longer operate their longbows, and that the V sign was used by uncaptured and victorious archers in a display of defiance against the French. The addition of the phrase fuck you to the misconception came when it was claimed that the English yelled that they could still pluck yew, (yew wood being the preferred material for longbows at the time), a phrase that evolved into the modern fuck you. In any event, the word fuck has been in use far too long for some of these supposed origins to be possible. Since no such acronym was ever recorded before the 1960s according to the lexicographical work The F-Word, such claims create at best a so-called "backronym".

Grammar
In terms of its parts of speech, fuck has a very flexible role in English grammar, functioning as both a transitive and intransitive verb, and as an adjective, adverb, noun, and interjection.

Although the word itself is used in its literal sense to refer to sexual intercourse, its most common usage is figurative—to indicate the speaker's strong sentiment and to offend or shock the listener. Linguist Geoffrey Hughes found eight distinct usages for English curse words, and fuck can apply to each. For example, it fits in the "curse" sense (fuck you!), as well as the "personal" sense (You fucker). In the Oxford English Dictionary, more than a hundred different senses, usages and collocations (like fuck around, fuck with s.o., fuck you, fuck me, fuck it) are identified for fuck, its derived forms (like fucker, fuckee, fuckability), and compounds with fuck (e.g. fuckfest, fuckhole, fuckface).

Early usage
In 2015, Dr. Paul Booth argued he had found "(possibly) the earliest known use of the word 'fuck' that clearly has a sexual connotation": in English court records of 1310–11, a man local to Chester is referred to as "Roger Fuckebythenavele", probably a nickname. "Either this refers to an inexperienced copulator, referring to someone trying to have sex with the navel, or it's a rather extravagant explanation for a dimwit, someone so stupid they think that this is the way to have sex", says Booth. An earlier name, that of John le Fucker recorded in 1278, has been the subject of debate, but is thought by many philologists to have had some separate and non-sexual origin.

Otherwise, the usually accepted first known occurrence of the word is found in code in a poem in a mixture of Latin and English composed in the 15th century. The poem, which satirizes the Carmelite friars of Cambridge, England, takes its title, "Flen flyys", from the first words of its opening line, Flen, flyys, and freris ('Fleas, flies, and friars'). The line that contains fuck reads Non sunt in coeli, quia gxddbov xxkxzt pg ifmk. Deciphering the phrase gxddbou xxkxzt pg ifmk, here by replacing each letter by the previous letter in alphabetical order, as the English alphabet was then, yields the macaronic non sunt in coeli, quia fuccant vvivys of heli, which translated means, 'They are not in heaven, because they fuck the women of Ely'. The phrase was probably encoded because it accused monks of breaking their vows of celibacy; it is uncertain to what extent the word fuck was considered acceptable at the time. The stem of fuccant is an English word used as Latin. In the Middle English of this poem, the term wife was still used generically for 'woman'.

William Dunbar's 1503 poem "Brash of Wowing" includes the lines: "Yit be his feiris he wald haue fukkit: / Ye brek my hairt, my bony ane" (ll. 13–14).

The oldest occurrence of the word in adjectival form (which implies use of the verb) in English comes from the margins of a 1528 manuscript copy of Cicero's De Officiis. A monk had scrawled in the margin notes, "fuckin Abbot". Whether the monk meant the word literally, to accuse this abbott of "questionable monastic morals", or whether he used it "as an intensifier, to convey his extreme dismay" is unclear.

John Florio's 1598 Italian–English dictionary, A Worlde of Wordes, included the term, along with several now-archaic, but then-vulgar synonyms, in this definition:
 Fottere: To jape, to sard, to fucke, to swive, to occupy.
Of these, "occupy" and "jape" still survive as verbs, though with less profane meanings, while "sard" was a descendant of the Anglo-Saxon verb seordan (or seorðan, ON serða), to copulate; and "swive" had derived from earlier swīfan, to revolve i.e. to swivel (compare modern-day "screw"). As late as the 18th century, the verb occupy was seldom used in print because it carried sexual overtones.

A 1790 poem by St. George Tucker has a father upset with his bookish son say "I'd not give [a fuck] for all you've read". Originally printed as "I'd not give ------ for all you've read", scholars agree that the words a fuck were removed, making the poem the first recorded instance of the now-common phrase I don't give a fuck.

Farmer and Henley's 1893 dictionary of slang notes both the adverbial and adjectival forms of fuck as similar to but "more violent" than bloody and indicating extreme insult, respectively.

Modern usage
The modern usage and flexibility of fuck was established by the mid-to-late 19th century, and has been fairly stable since. Most literally, to fuck is to have sex, but it is also used as a more general expletive or intensifier.

Insertion of the trochaic word fucking can also be used as an exercise for diagnosing the cadence of an English-language word. This is the use of fuck or more specifically fucking as an infix, or more properly, a tmesis (see expletive infixation). For example, the word in-fucking-credible sounds acceptable to the English ear, and is in fairly common use, while *incred-fucking-ible would sound very clumsy (though, depending on the context, this might be perceived as a humorous improvisation of the word). Abso-fucking-lutely and motherfucking are also common uses of fuck as an affix. While neither dysphemistic nor connected to the sexual connotations of the word, even the vacuous usages are considered offensive and gratuitous, such as This is fucking awesome! Fuck has colloquial usage as a verb, adverb, adjective, conjunction, interjection, noun, and pronoun.

The word fuck is a component of many acronyms, some of which—like SNAFU (Situation Normal: All Fucked Up) and FUBAR (Fucked Up Beyond All Recognition)—date as far back as World War II. MILF (Mother I'd Like to Fuck) and variations of the first letter are widely seen in pornographic contexts. Many more recent coinages, such as the shorthand WTF? for 'what the fuck', STFU for 'shut the fuck up', or FML for 'fuck my life', have been widely extant on the Internet, and may count as examples of internet memes. Many acronyms will also have an F or MF added to increase emphasis; for example, OMG ('oh my God') becomes OMFG ('oh my fucking God'). Abbreviations involving fuck can be considered less offensive than fuck itself. Although the word is proclaimed vulgar, several comedians rely on fuck for comedic routines. George Carlin created several literary works based upon the word, including his routine "seven dirty words"—words that were bleep censored on US television.

Examples of more recent usage
In 1928, English writer D. H. Lawrence's novel Lady Chatterley's Lover gained notoriety for its frequent use of the words fuck and fucking. The Catcher in the Rye by J. D. Salinger featured the use of fuck you in print. First published in the United States in 1951, the novel remains controversial to this day due in part to its use of the word, standing at number 13 for the most banned books from 1990 to 2000 according to the American Library Association.

The first documented use of the word fuck on live British television has been attributed to theatre critic Kenneth Tynan in 1965, though it has been claimed Irish playwright Brendan Behan used the word on Panorama in 1956 or the man who painted the railings on Stranmillis Embankment alongside the River Lagan in Belfast, who in 1959 told Ulster TV's teatime magazine programme Roundabout that his job was "fucking boring". The Bill Grundy incident was a controversy that ensued in 1976 when Today host Bill Grundy interviewed the Sex Pistols, after guitarist Steve Jones called Grundy a "dirty fucker" and a "fucking rotter".

The word began to break into cinema when it was uttered once in the film Vapor (1963) and in two Andy Warhol films – Poor Little Rich Girl (1965) and My Hustler (1965), and later in each of two 1967 British releases, Ulysses and I'll Never Forget What's'isname. It was used several times in the 1969 British film Bronco Bullfrog. According to director Robert Altman, the first time the word fuck was used in a major American studio film was in 1970's M*A*S*H, spoken by Painless during the football match at the end of the film.

Use in politics

Fuck is not widely used in politics, and the use of the word by politicians often produces controversy. Some events include:
 In 1965, US President Lyndon B. Johnson said to the Greek ambassador Alexandros Matsas when he objected to American plans in Cyprus, "Fuck your parliament and your constitution. America is an elephant. Cyprus is a flea. Greece is a flea. If these two fellows continue itching the elephant they may just get whacked by the elephant's trunk, whacked good".
 Former British Secretary of State for Defence Denis Healey reported that the penultimate High Commissioner of Aden (1965–1967), Sir Richard Turnbull, stated that, "When the British Empire finally sinks beneath the waves of history, it will leave behind it only two memorials: one is the game of Association Football and the other is the expression 'Fuck Off'."
 During debate in February 1971 in the House of Commons of Canada, Canadian Prime Minister Pierre Trudeau mouthed the words "fuck off" at Conservative MP John Lundrigan, while Lundrigan made some comments about unemployment. Afterward, when asked by a television reporter what he had been thinking, Trudeau famously replied: "What is the nature of your thoughts, gentlemen, when you say 'fuddle duddle' or something like that?". "Fuddle duddle" consequently became a catchphrase in Canadian media associated with Trudeau.
 The first accepted modern use in the British House of Commons came in 1982 when Reg Race, Labour MP for Wood Green, referred to adverts placed in local newsagents by prostitutes which read "Phone them and fuck them." Hansard, the full record of debates, printed "F*** them", but even this euphemism was deprecated by the Speaker, George Thomas.
 During the George W. Bush presidency, a vehicular bumper sticker with the words Buck Fush (a spoonerism of "Fuck Bush") gained some popularity in the US.
 In June 2004, US Vice President Dick Cheney told Democratic senator Patrick Leahy, "Go fuck yourself." Coincidentally, Cheney's outburst occurred on the same day that the Defense of Decency Act was passed in the Senate.
 In February 2006, Premier of the Australian state of New South Wales Morris Iemma, while awaiting the start of a Council of Australian Governments media conference in Canberra, was chatting to Victorian Premier Steve Bracks. Not realizing microphones were recording, he said, "Today? This fuckwit who's the new CEO of the Cross City Tunnel has ... been saying what controversy? There is no controversy." The exchange referred to the newly appointed CEO of the recently opened Cross City Tunnel toll road within Sydney.
 In 2007, U.S. Senator John Cornyn objected to John McCain's perceived intrusion upon a Senate meeting on immigration, saying, "Wait a second here. I've been sitting in here for all of these negotiations and you just parachute in here on the last day. You're out of line." McCain replied "Fuck you! I know more about this than anyone else in the room."
 In April 2007, New Zealand Education Minister Steve Maharey said "fuck you" to a fellow MP during parliamentary question time. He apologized shortly afterwards.
 In December 2008, recorded telephone conversations revealed Illinois Governor Rod Blagojevich trying to "sell" an appointment to the Senate seat that Barack Obama resigned after being elected president. In the phone conversation, Blagojevich said in reference to his power to appoint a new senator, "I've got this thing and it's fucking golden and I'm just not giving it up for fuckin' nothing." In the recorded conversations, Blagojevich also referred to Obama as a "motherfucker" and repeatedly said, "fuck him". When speaking of the Obama administration's request that Valerie Jarrett be appointed as Obama's replacement, Blagojevich complained, "They're not willing to give me anything except appreciation. Fuck them." Blagojevich also said Tribune Company ownership should be told to "fire those fuckers" in reference to Chicago Tribune editors critical of him.
 In December 2009 in Dáil Éireann (the lower house of the Irish Parliament), Paul Gogarty responded to heckles from Emmet Stagg with the outburst, "With all due respect, in the most unparliamentary language, fuck you, Deputy Stagg. Fuck you." Gogarty immediately withdrew the remarks and later made a personal statement of apology. Reporting of the outburst quickly spread by media and the Internet. A subcommittee of the Dáil's standing committee on procedure and privilege produced a 28-page report on the incident.
 On March 23, 2010, US Vice President Joe Biden whispered into President Barack Obama's ear, "This is a big fucking deal" when referring to the US health care reform bill. His words were picked up by microphones and video.
 On May 3, 2010, Canadian senator Nancy Ruth advised representatives of women's groups to "shut the fuck up" on access to abortion, in the run-up to the 36th G8 summit.
 In late 2012, the then-US House Speaker John Boehner was visiting the White House, where he saw then Senate Majority Leader Harry Reid in the lobby. Boehner was under great stress about the impending fiscal cliff, and Reid had also accused him of running a "dictatorship" in the house. Boehner saw Harry Reid, pointed his finger at him, and told him, "Go fuck yourself!" Reid replied by saying, "What are you talking about?" Boehner then repeated what he had told him and left.
 In late 2016, Philippine President Rodrigo Duterte reacted to the European Parliament's criticism over the prevalence of unsolved extrajudicial killings which occurred during his "War on Drugs" by lashing out at EU politicians, claiming that they were "hypocrites" whose colonial-era ancestors had killed "thousands" of Arabs and other peoples during the colonial period. Upon making an obscene hand gesture, Duterte stated that he told EU politicians, "When I read the EU condemnation I told them 'fuck you.' You are only doing it to atone for your own sins" and "They do not want a safe Philippines. They want it to be ruled by criminals. Oh, well, I'm sorry. That is your idiotic view". Duterte also said, in response to growing international criticism, the "EU now has the gall to condemn me. I repeat it, fuck you."
 On June 10, 2018, Robert De Niro sparked controversy during the 72nd Tony Awards as he cursed US President Donald Trump with the word during the live broadcast. He started with the sentence: "I'm gonna say one thing: Fuck Trump." He clenched his two fists in the air, and ended his remarks by saying "It's no longer down with Trump, it's fuck Trump!" He received a standing ovation from the audience, which was mostly celebrities.
On August 5, 2019, Beto O'Rourke after learning of a mass shooting in his home town of El Paso, Texas stated "He's been calling Mexican immigrants rapists and criminals. I don't know, like, members of the press, what the fuck?" referring to Donald Trump when asked for his reaction to the shooting.
During a virtual live telecast Senate hearing on August 21, 2020, Senator Tom Carper shouted: "Fuck! Fuck! Fuck!" over a video chat that was being broadcast nationwide.
 During his October 9, 2020 appearance on The Rush Limbaugh Show, US President Donald Trump stated in a threat to Iran, "If you fuck around with us, if you do something bad to us, we are going to do things to you that have never been done before."
 In 2021, "Let's Go Brandon" became a political slogan and internet meme used as a euphemism for "Fuck Joe Biden", the president of the United States.
 In 2022, President Joe Biden said to the mayor of Fort Myers Beach, Florida, "No one fucks with a Biden," to which Mayor Ray Murphey responded, "Yeah, you're goddamn right."

Use in marketing
In April 1997, clothing retailer French Connection began branding their clothes with fcuk (usually written in lowercase), stating it was an acronym for "French Connection United Kingdom". Its similarity to the word fuck caused controversy. French Connection produced a range of T-shirts with messages such as "fcuk this", "hot as fcuk", "cool as fcuk", "fcuk fashion", etc. 

In 2009, the European Union's OHIM trade marks agency disallowed a German brewery to market a beer called "Fucking Hell". They sued, and on March 26, 2010 got permission to market the beer. The company argued that it was actually named after the Austrian village of Fucking (now spelled Fugging) and the German term for light beer, hell (which is simply the word for "light-coloured").

Iancu v. Brunetti is a United States Supreme Court case in which the owner of the clothing brand FUCT (supposedly standing for "Friends U Can't Trust") sued the Patent and Trademark Office, which refused to trademark the name for being "scandalous" under the Lanham Act.

Band names
The word fuck has been used in a number of band names, such as Fucked Up, generally based on common compounds. Many of these bands fall into the genres of punk and metal, while some fall into the categories of electronic rock and pop, such as Holy Fuck and Fuck Buttons

F-bomb
The phrase dropping an F-bomb usually refers to the unanticipated use of the word fuck in an unexpected setting, such as public media, a play on the nickname for the hydrogen bomb (the "H-bomb") and the shock value that using the word fuck in discourse carries. The term was first reported in a newspaper (Newsday) in 1988 when Hall of Fame baseball catcher Gary Carter used it. In 2012 it was listed, for the first time, in the mainstream Merriam-Webster's Collegiate Dictionary.

Censorship
In the United States, the word is frequently edited out of music and films when broadcast on TV, such as in the film The Big Lebowski, when John Goodman's character repeatedly yells, "This is what happens when you fuck a stranger in the ass". It was censored on television as "This is what happens when you find a stranger in the Alps."

Still, in 1971, the US Supreme Court decided that the public display of fuck is protected under the First and Fourteenth amendments and cannot be made a criminal offense. In 1968, Paul Robert Cohen had been convicted of disturbing the peace for wearing a jacket with the slogan "Fuck the Draft" (in a reference to conscription in the Vietnam War). The conviction was upheld by the court of appeals and overturned by the Supreme Court in Cohen v. California.

Common alternatives

In conversation or writing, reference to or use of the word fuck may be replaced by any of many alternative words or phrases, including the F-word or the F-bomb (a play on A-bomb and H-bomb), or simply, eff or f (as in What the eff/F or You effing/f'ing fool). Also, there are many commonly used substitutes, such as flipping, frigging, fricking, freaking, feck, fudge, flaming, forget or any of a number of similar-sounding nonsense words. In print, there are alternatives such as, F***, F––k, etc.; or a string of non-alphanumeric characters, for example, @$#*%! and similar (especially favored in comic books).

A replacement word that was used mainly on Usenet newsgroups is fsck, derived from the name of the Unix file system checking utility.

See also

 Army creole
 The finger, a related hand gesture
 Four-letter word
 Harcourt interpolation
 List of films that most frequently use the word "fuck"
 List of common false etymologies of English words
 Madonna on Late Show with David Letterman in 1994
 Profanity
 Sexual slang

References

Dictionaries

Sources

External links

English profanity
English words
Etymologies
Interjections
Sexual slang